"Gangsta Zone" is a song by rappers Daddy Yankee and Snoop Dogg, released in 2005 as the second single from Yankee's album Barrio Fino en Directo.

Music video
The music video was filmed on January 27, 2006 at locations around Torres Sabana, a public housing project in Carolina, one of the largest cities in Puerto Rico. The video is shot in grayscale,  and Daddy Yankee said the video depicts "the real way we live on the island".

Charts

Remix
A remix of "Gangsta Zone" was also released, featuring reggaeton artists Héctor el Father, Yomo, Arcángel & De La Ghetto and Angel Doze. It is a diss track aimed towards Don Omar.

Charts

References

2005 songs
2005 singles
Spanish-language songs
Daddy Yankee songs
Snoop Dogg songs
Songs written by Daddy Yankee
Songs written by Snoop Dogg